Giammaria is the name of:

 Giammaria Biemmi, Italian priest 
 Giammaria Mazzucchelli (1707–1765), Italian writer, bibliographer and historian
 Giammaria Ortes (1713–1790), Venetian composer, economist, mathematician, Camaldolese monk, and philosopher

See also
 Gianmaria, given name
 Jean-Marie, given name
 Raffaele Giammaria (born 1977), Italian racing car driver

Italian masculine given names